Chakhlovo is a rural locality (a station) in Podlesnoye Rural Settlement, Vologodsky District, Vologda Oblast, Russia. The population was 8 as of 2002.

Geography 
Chakhlovo is located 32 km southeast of Vologda (the district's administrative centre) by road. Katunino is the nearest rural locality.

References 

Rural localities in Vologodsky District